Fastnet Rock is an Australian Thoroughbred racehorse stallion.

Sired by Danehill to dam Piccadilly Circus, he started his racing career in 2004. Though he did not win any races as a two-year-old, he ran third in the Group One AJC Sires Produce Stakes. He found great success after turning three years old. After being unplaced in the Caulfield Guineas, he proved himself as one of the top Australian sprinters by winning the Group 1 Lightning Stakes and Oakleigh Plate in February 2005.

Trainer Paul Perry wished Fastnet Rock to repeat the successful English campaign by Choisir, who is trained by Perry, in 2003. After he ran second in the T J Smith Stakes in March 2005, Fastnet Rock was sent to the United Kingdom to prepare for the Group 1 Golden Jubilee Stakes and July Cup. He suffered from travel sickness and was unable to run in any race in the UK and was retired to stud.

Race record

Stud record
Fastnet Rock began his career at stud in 2005 standing at Coolmore Stud Australia in the Hunter Region of New South Wales Shuttled to Ireland 2010-21. In 2007 he covered 257 mares, second only behind Bel Esprit (266). In 2008 Fastnet Rock covered 248 mares at a fee of $82,500. In 2012 his fee was increased to $220,000 making him the most expensive stallion standing at stud in Australia. In 2013 Fastnet Rock's fee rose again to $275,000 which made him $100,000 dearer than the second most expensive stallion in Australia, Redoute's Choice. Fastnet Rock has sired 17 individual Group 1 winning horses including multiple Group 1 winners Mosheen, Sea Siren and Atlantic Jewel. Other notable Stakes winners include Smart Missile, Driefontein, Cluster, Bull Point, Albany Reunion and Hvasstan.
It has 115th stakes winner as at 14 May 2017.

Fastnet Rock's service fee:

Progeny
Fastnet Rock has currently sired 42 individual Group 1 winners:

Notable progeny

c = colt, f = filly, g = gelding''

Pedigree 

 Fastnet Rock is inbred 3 × 4 to Northern Dancer

See also
 List of millionaire racehorses in Australia
 Leading sire in Australia

References

External links
Coolmore Australia Stallion Profile

2001 racehorse births
Racehorses bred in Australia
Racehorses trained in Australia
Thoroughbred family 2-f